Rhagium mexicanum is a species of beetle in the family Cerambycidae. It was described by Casey in 1913.

References

Lepturinae
Beetles described in 1913